The 1969–70 LSU Tigers basketball team represented Louisiana State University as a member of the Southeastern Conference during the 1969–70 NCAA men's basketball season. The team’s head coach was Press Maravich, in his fourth season at LSU. They played their home games at the John M. Parker Agricultural Coliseum in Baton Rouge, Louisiana. The Tigers finished the season 22–10, 13–5 in SEC play to finish in second place. LSU received an invitation to the National Invitation Tournament where they defeated Georgetown and Oklahoma before losing in to No. 8 Marquette in the semifinals.

Roster

Schedule and results

|-
!colspan=9 style=|Regular season

|-
!colspan=9 style=|National Invitation Tournament

Rankings

Awards and honors
Pete Maravich – National Player of the Year, Consensus First-team All-American (3x), NCAA Scoring Leader (3x), SEC Player of the Year (3x), All-time single-season NCAA scoring average (44.5 ppg), All-time NCAA scoring leader (3,667 points)

1970 NBA Draft

References 

LSU Tigers basketball seasons
LSU
LSU
LSU
LSU